The 2010–11 West Midlands (Regional) League season was the 111th in the history of the West Midlands (Regional) League, an English association football competition for semi-professional and amateur teams based in the West Midlands county, Shropshire, Herefordshire, Worcestershire and southern Staffordshire. It has three divisions, the highest of which is the Premier Division, which sits at step 6 of the National League System, or the tenth level of the overall English football league system.

Premier Division

The Premier Division featured 17 clubs which competed in the division last season, along with three new clubs:
Cradley Town, relegated from the Midland Football Alliance
Shifnal Town, relegated from the Midland Football Alliance
Stafford Town, promoted from Division One

Also, Heath Town Rangers changed name to Wolverhampton Sporting Community.

League table

Stadia and locations

References

External links
 West Midlands (Regional) League

2010–11
10